Abganerovo is a rural locality (a village) in Privolnenskoye Rural Settlement of Svetloyarsky District, Volgograd Oblast, Russia. The population was 850 as of 2010. There are 12 streets.

Geography 
The village is located on the watershed of the basins of the Myshkova and Gniloy Aksay rivers, 84 km southwest of Svetly Yar (the district's administrative centre) by road. Privolny is the nearest rural locality.

References 

Rural localities in Svetloyarsky District